Sir Harry Thurston Hookway (23 July 1921 – 25 June 2014) was a chief executive and civil servant. He was the first Chief Executive of the British Library, serving from 1973 to 1984. He was born in London in 1921, and attended the Trinity School of John Whitgift in Croydon. His academic studies culminated in the award of a PhD in Chemistry from Battersea College of Technology (now the University of Surrey), after which he worked  as a scientific attaché to  the British Embassy in Washington, reporting on the technological revolution in the USA that was causing the ‘brain drain’ of British scientists to organisations such as NASA. In Washington he forged a partnership with the National Endowment for the Humanities to take forward the English Short Title Catalogue covering the 18th century. He foresaw the digital revolution and made plans for the catalogue to be digitised.

Though not a librarian himself, he worked closely with members of the profession during his time at the British Library, and served as President of the Institute of Information Scientists from 1973 to 1976.

References

1921 births
2014 deaths
Employees of the British Library
British civil servants
Knights Bachelor